Chandeep Uppal (born 19 July 1988) is a British actress best known for her critically acclaimed starring role as Meena Kumar in the film Anita and Me.

Career
Uppal is known for her performances in the Bafta Award-winning children's series My Life as a Popat, in which she plays Dimple, the outspoken, teenage daughter of a British-Indian family.

She played barmaid Narinder Gurai in the UK soap opera Echo Beach, which ran from January to March 2008. She played the role of Ayesha Begham in an episode of Holby City and appeared on the popular sketch show, Harry and Paul, for the BBC. She made two appearances in BBC drama series Waterloo Road in episodes 15 and 16 of the current fourth series as Waffa. She again starred in Holby City as Sunita Majvi, a character with cancer who befriends the temporarily paralysed nurse Maria Kendall. Her character died on Tuesday 13 October in the episode entitled "The Uncertainty Principle". Chandeep played the part of Amita (one of Del's 'fiancées') in the Rock & Chips 2010 Christmas Special: "Five Gold Rings".

Uppal appears in the BBC comedy thriller, The Wrong Mans, as Sabrina. The show was written by, and stars, Mathew Baynton and James Corden. The premiere was on 24 September 2013.

She featured as Frankie opposite Ainsley Howard in three episodes of the third series of Sky 1 comedy Mount Pleasant in 2013.

In January 2020, Uppal appeared as murder suspect Jasra Hatoum in the third series of light-hearted crime drama Shakespeare & Hathaway: Private Investigators.

She also helped found The Space Birmingham, an agency that helps to promote digital engagement across the arts and cultural sector.

Filmography

Film
 2002: Anita & Me - Meena Kumar

Television
 2004–2007: My Life as a Popat - Dimple Popat (12 episodes)
 2007: All About Me - Anji (television film)
 2008: Echo Beach - Narinder Gurai (12 episodes)
 2008: Moving Wallpaper - Herself (4 episodes; uncredited)
 2009: Waterloo Road - Waffa (2 episodes)
 2008–2009: Holby City - Sunita Mavji/Ayesha Begum (5 episodes)
 2010: Rock & Chips - Amita (1 episode)
 2013: A Nice Arrangement - Jaswinder
 2013: The Wrong Mans - Sabrina
 2013: Mount Pleasant - Frankie
 2019: Doctors - Bahija Uppal (1 episode)
 2020: Shakespeare and Hathaway: Private Investigators - Jasra Hatoum (Series 3, Episode 5)

References

External links
 
 Times Online article
 film Anita and Me details

1988 births
British actresses of Indian descent
English Sikhs
Living people
English child actresses
People from Birmingham, West Midlands
English people of Punjabi descent
English soap opera actresses